Sudislavsky District is an administrative and municipal district (raion), one of the twenty-four in Kostroma Oblast, Russia. It is located in the southwest of the oblast. Its administrative center is the urban locality (an urban-type settlement) of Sudislavl. Population:  15,184 (2002 Census);  The population of Sudislavl accounts for 37.7% of the district's total population.

References

Notes

Sources

Districts of Kostroma Oblast